Resurs-DK No.1, also called Resurs-DK1, was a commercial Earth observation satellite capable of transmitting high-resolution imagery (up to 0.9 m) to the ground stations as it passed overhead. The spacecraft was operated by NTs OMZ, the Russian Research Center for Earth Operative Monitoring.

The satellite was designed for multi-spectral remote sensing of the Earth's surface aimed at acquiring high-quality visible images in near real-time as well as on-line data delivery via radio link and providing a wide range of consumers with value-added processed data.

The Russian space tracking service, ASPOS OKP, reported that the spacecraft's onboard systems and attitude control had been terminated in February 2016. Tracking of the satellite was discontinued on 1 March 2016.

Spacecraft 
The Resurs-DK spacecraft was built by the Russian space company TsSKB-Progress in Samara, Russia. It was a modified version of the military reconnaissance satellite Yantar-4KS1 (Terilen). The spacecraft was three-axis stabilized. The design lifetime was no less than three years, with an expected lifetime of five years. Onboard storage was 768 gigabits. Data link speed to the ground station was 300 Mbit/s.

Resurs is Russian for "Resource". The letters DK are the initials of Dmitry Kozlov, chief designer of the first satellite of the Yantar-2K class.

Optical subsystem 
 Type: apochromatic telephoto
 Focal length: 4000 mm
 Objective diameter: 500 mm
 Spectral range: 0.5-0.9 μm
 Mass: 310 kg

Made by Vavilov State Optical Institute, Russia  .

Spectral Resolution 
 0.58-0.8 μm panchromatic
 0.5-0.6 μm green
 0.6-0.7 μm red
 0.7-0.8 μm visible and near infrared

It was not possible to represent an image in true-color because there was no blue band (0.4 - 0.5 μm). However, it was possible to combine red, green and near infrared in such way that the appearance of the displayed image resembles a visible colour photograph, i.e. vegetation in green, water in blue, soil in brown. This was not always possible because two similarly coloured objects can have completely different reactions to near IR light.

Green, red and near IR are typically combined to make a traditional false color composite where the near IR is displayed in red, the red is displayed in green, and the green is displayed in blue. This combination is favoured by scientists because near IR is useful for detection of numerous vegetation types. Vegetation appear as redtones, the brighter the red, the healthier the vegetation. Soils with no or sparse vegetation range from white (sand, salt) to greens or browns depending on moisture and organic matter content. Water appears blue, clear water is dark blue to black while shallow waters or waters with high sediment concentrations are lighter blue. Urban areas will appear blue towards gray. Clouds and snow are white.

Focal Plane Unit 

Unit featured 4 TDI (Time Delay and Integration) sensor arrays, one panchromatic and three multispectral. Each sensor array was composed of 36 "Kruiz" CCD chips. Effective length of the single array was about 36000 pixels. Arrays were grouped in 3 separated lines:

 near infrared
 panchromatic and red
 green

This separation was causing a time delay of the colour images combined from green, red and near infrared, so fast-moving objects were shown in triplets. Moving object speed and direction could be calculated. All 4 arrays could work simultaneously, so it was possible to combine panchromatic and 3 multispectral images in one pansharpened color composite.

The system used 10-bit analog-to-digital converters.

Focal Plane Unit was made by NPO Opteks, Russia .

CCD 
The CCD "Kruiz" was a 1024 pixel x 128 line, high speed TDI sensor. The active imaging area was organized as 1024 vertical columns and 128 horizontal TDI rows. 

 Pixel size: 9 x 9 μm
 Number of TDI stages electronically selectable: 128, 64, 32, 16, 8
 Two readout shift registers and two output amplifiers allowing twice faster readout
 Selftest without illumination
 Full well capacity: 120 000 electrons
 Dynamic range: 2500
 Charge transfer efficiency in any direction: more than 0.99998 per transfer
 Maximum quantum efficiency: 0.33 (at 0.72 μm).

Designed jointly by NPO Opteks and ELECTRON-OPTRONIC.
Produced by ELECTRON-OPTRONIC (now is ELAR )

Spatial resolution

Panchromatic 
At the altitude of 360 km:
 Nadir: 0.9 m
 30° tilt: 1.0 m

At the altitude of 604 km:
 Nadir: 1.5 m
 30° tilt: 1.7 m

Multispectral 
1.5–2.0 m

Temporal resolution 
The revisit rate was 5 to 7 days off-nadir.

Swath 
Swath width at the altitude of 350 km:
 4.7 - 28.3 km (at nadir)
 40 km (at ± 30°)

ARINA 
Russian research hardware for detection of high-energetic electrons and protons, their identification, detection of high-energetic particles bursts – earthquake signs.
 Mass: 9 kg

PAMELA 

PAMELA, Payload for Antimatter Matter Exploration and Light-nuclei Astrophysics was an attached module built by Italian researchers with international partners. Its purpose was basic physics research of primary cosmic rays.
 Mass: 470 kg

Major current tasks 
 Data supply for resource management and economical activity (inventory of natural resources, topographic and thematic mapping).
 Monitoring of pollution sources of the atmosphere, water and soil with the view of providing Federal and regional environmental authorities with the relevant information to make management decisions.
 On-line monitoring of man-caused and natural emergencies for the purpose of effective planning and timely performing of measures to eliminate damages.
 Supplying home and foreign consumers on a commercial basis.
 Research activities (PAMELA and ARINA experiments).

Major orbit change 
The satellite was initially placed in a  orbit in 2006.

See also 

 Persona (satellite)

References

External links 
 
 Over 14000 images from Resurs-DK1
 26 high resolution images from Resurs-DK1
 Gallery of images

Earth observation satellites of Russia
Derelict satellites orbiting Earth
Spacecraft launched by Soyuz-U rockets
Spacecraft launched in 2006
Commercial Earth imaging satellites